Burton Latimer is a town in North Northamptonshire, England, approximately  from Kettering. At the 2011 census, its population was 7,449.

History
Burton (Latimer) appears in 3 entries in the Domesday Book of 1086.

Tenant-in-chief and Lord in 1086: Guy of Raimbeaucourt. 
Households: 21 villagers. 18 smallholders. 1 slave. 
Ploughland: 14 ploughlands (tre). 3 lord's plough teams. 9 men's plough teams. 
Other resources: 3.0 lord's lands. Meadow 20 acres. Woodland 0.5 acres. 2 mills, value 0.8. 
Phillimore reference: 41,1

Tenant-in-chief in 1086: Bishop Geoffrey of Coutances. Lord in 1086: Walkelin of Harrowden. 
Households: 9 villagers. 5 smallholders. 1 slave. 1 female slave. 
Ploughland: 5 ploughlands (land for). 2 lord's plough teams. 3.5 men's plough teams. 
Other resources: Meadow 15 acres. 
Phillimore reference: 4,9

Tenant-in-chief in 1086: Bishop Geoffrey of Coutances. Lord in 1086 Richard
Households: 3 villagers. 1 smallholder. 1 slave. 
Ploughland: 3 ploughlands (land for). 1 lord's plough teams. 1 men's plough teams. 
Other resources: Meadow 6 acres. 
Phillimore reference: 4,12

In the reign of Edward the Confessor (1042-1066), Earl Ralph, probably the Earl of Hereford, held 8½ hides of land, which constituted, until the first half of the 13th century the whole of the Manor of Burton, and paid the service due from 1.5 Knight's Fees.

In 1086 the manor was held directly from the king by Guy de Reinbuedcurt (Reimbeaucourt), whose youngest son, Richard, was the tenant under Henry I (1100-1135). Richard is said to have pledged the manor in payment of a gambling debt to the king, who then granted it to hold at pleasure, to Alan de Dinant, a Breton who defeated the champion of the King of France near Gisors.

The second part of the town's name is derived from the le Latimer family who lived there in the 13th century. The first part of the name usually means fortified farmstead or farmstead near a fortification.  Before the arrival of the Latimers, it was known as 'Burtone'. It grew in the 19th Century around the ironstone quarrying, clothing and footwear industries. A watermill used for grinding corn was converted and used at various times in the 19th century for the manufacture of silk and worsted and for carpet-weaving, followed by its conversion to a steam mill to make chicory, mustard, animal foodstuffs and flour. The mill was acquired in the 1930s and became the home of Weetabix, which is also produced in Corby.

Industrial history 
In the last part of the 19th century, two new industries arrived.

By 1885, the first four clothing factories had opened, followed in 1898 by the first shoe factory, and Burton grew rapidly to become a small, thriving light-industrial town.

Ironstone quarrying began in about 1872 to the north of the town, to the south of the Kettering, Thrapston and Huntingdon Railway. More quarries were started in the west in the vicinity of Polwell Lane and more extensively on the east side of the town. The last pits ceased production of iron ore in 1921. The ore was taken by  gauge tramways to the mainline railways. At first the tramways were worked by horses but steam locomotives were introduced from about 1892. The quarry near Polwell Lane was re-opened in 1925 for the extraction of ganister. The tramway to the main railway from this quarry was operated by small diesel locomotives. The quarry ceased production in 1983.

By 2000 the town's new bypass and the building of the A14 made the town attractive again as a manufacturing and distribution centre. High-profile national firms like Versalift, Alpro Soya and Abbeyboard have based themselves on the north side of town.

Landmarks

A notable building in the town is the parish church, dedicated to St Mary the Virgin, which was consecrated in 1147. The Norman church was remodelled and added to at various times up to about 1310. It was restored and the tower rebuilt in 1866.  It contains a number of medieval wall paintings, a 15th-century chancel screen and some memorial brasses. The oldest of the latter is located between the south arcade and chancel screen and features the coat of arms of the Boyville family; it was almost certainly placed there in the early 16th century to commemorate Richard Boyville, his wife Gresyll and their children.

The war memorial was erected in 1922.

The town is home to the land-owning Harpur family, who have owned the Grade I listed Burton Latimer Hall since 1760, together with other land around the town.

There is a Jacobean House, built in 1622, which was formerly a school.

Modern day
Burton Latimer is the location of the first wind farm in Northamptonshire. Burton Wold Wind Farm, operated by Your Energy, has 10 turbines, producing enough electricity to power around 8,500 homes annually. The wind farm is the largest inland wind farm. Burton Latimer is home to the Weetabix food company, Shield aluminium, and several group undertakings and a Wm Morrisons supermarket distribution centre, which are major local employers.

There are two fish and chip shops, three Indian restaurants, two Italian restaurants, and numerous shops. There is a Sainsbury's store, and a One Stop store.

The town has the Beavers, Cubs, and Scouts based locally.

In addition to the ancient St. Mary's Church (built in 1187), there are 4 churches in the town. The other 3 are: Burton Latimer Methodist Church, Burton Latimer Baptist Church, and St. Nicholas Owen RC Church.

There is the Britannia Working Men's Club, the Olde Victoria and a band club. There is a Conservative club, and a civic centre, as well as a community centre.

There is a Pocket Park, established in 1995, with 11 acres of land and wildlife. There is the Millennium Gardens, constructed in 2000.

There is a medical centre (Burton Latimer Medical Centre), which has a surgery in the town, as well as one in Finedon. The medical centre was completed in 2004, to replace the previous centre, which had been built in 1970. It has doctors (general practitioners), and nurse practitioners. The pharmacy (in Burton Latimer) is next to the centre. Most referrals are made to Kettering General Hospital.

There have been many new houses built, such as the estates of Latimer Gardens, Buckby Grange and Mutlow Estate.

A wood on the western edge of the town, accessed via Diana Way and running behind Virginia Crescent, is known locally as 'Uggs 'Ole, a corruption of 'hog's hole.' The wood leads down to the River Ise and across to the village of Isham.

Governance

Burton Latimer has a town council consisting of 12 members, a mayor and deputy mayor. The town is governed by North Northamptonshire Council, following the abolition of the borough and district councils in Northamptonshire. Northamptonshire County Council was also abolished on 31 March 2021 and the existing authorities were replaced with two new unitary authorities on 1 April 2021- North Northamptonshire Council in the north and east of Northamptonshire and West Northamptonshire Council in the south and west of Northamptonshire. At Westminster, Burton Latimer is part of the Kettering constituency.

Transport 
It is just south of the junction of the A6 and A14. The A6 bypass, which is 2 miles long, was completed in October 1991. Buses run through Burton Latimer. These include the 47, 48, 49, and 50.

Isham and Burton Latimer railway station served the town between 1857 and 1950. Now the nearest railway station is at Kettering.

Sport

Burton Latimer has a non-league football team Burton Park Wanderers F.C. who play at Latimer Park.  In 2013, Kettering Town moved in with Burton Park Wanderers, and still are playing there.

Burton Latimer has an amateur cricket team, Burton Latimer Town Cricket Club, who play at Hall Field, on Kettering Road. It has three XI sides, and one female XI The first XI play in Division 1 of the Northamptonshire Cricket League, the second XI play in Division 6 of the Northamptonshire Cricket League, and the third XI play in Division 11 of the Northamptonshire Cricket League.

The town also has a bowls club, as well as various sports clubs, based at various community centres. There are tennis courts, by the recreation ground.

Education

The town has two main primary schools: Meadowside Primary School, and St. Mary's C of E Primary School. The town has no secondary schools, but a common, yet incorrect, assumption is that the nearby Latimer Arts College is in the town - it was intended to be, but is instead located in nearby Barton Seagrave, close to Kettering.

There are two nurseries, Acorn Day Nursery, and Appletree Day Nursery.

Twin Towns

Burton Latimer has a town twinning agreement with:

 Altendiez, Germany since 1987
 Castelnuovo Magra, Italy since 2002

Notable residents

Charley Hull, professional golfer

References

External links
 Burton Latimer Online - Community website
 Historical website

Towns in Northamptonshire
North Northamptonshire
Civil parishes in Northamptonshire